Fanson Castle is a castle in the village of Xhoris in Ferrières, Liège Province, Wallonia, Belgium.

See also
List of castles in Belgium

External links
Le château de Fanson - xhoris.be

Castles in the Ardennes (Belgium)
Castles in Belgium
Castles in Liège Province
Ferrières, Belgium